The 1993–94 season was the 48th season in Rijeka's history. It was their 3rd season in the Prva HNL and 20th successive top tier season.

Competitions

Prva HNL

Classification

Results summary

Results by round

Matches

Prva HNL

Source: HRnogomet.com

Croatian Cup

Source: HRnogomet.com

Squad statistics
Competitive matches only.  Appearances in brackets indicate numbers of times the player came on as a substitute.

See also
1993–94 Prva HNL
1993–94 Croatian Cup

References

External sources
 1993–94 Prva HNL at HRnogomet.com
 1993–94 Croatian Cup at HRnogomet.com 
 Prvenstvo 1993.-94. at nk-rijeka.hr

HNK Rijeka seasons
Rijeka